Chevrolet, nicknamed Chevy, is an American automobile brand by General Motors.

The name Chevrolet or Chevy may also refer to:

People
 Arthur Chevrolet (1884–1946), Swiss-American racer and businessman
 Gaston Chevrolet (1892–1920), Swiss-American racer and businessman
 Louis Chevrolet (1878–1941), Swiss-American racer and businessman
 Chevy Chase (b. 1941), American comedian

Cars
 Opel Corsa, called in Mexico "Chevrolet Chevy"
 List of Chevrolet vehicles

Sports
 Chevrolet Warriors, a South African cricket team
 2012 Chevrolet Detroit Belle Isle Grand Prix, an IZOD IndyCar Series race held in Detroit

Buildings
 Chevrolet Hall, a convention center in Belo Horizonte, Brazil

Places
Chevrolet, Kentucky, United States

Films
 Chevrolet, a Spanish film from 1997
 El chevrolé, a Uruguayan film from 1999

See also
 Chevy Chase (disambiguation)